Scolymus maculatus is a spiny annual plant in the family Asteraceae, native to the Mediterranean region in southern Europe, southwest Asia, and northern Africa, and also the Canary Islands. It has pinnately incised prickly leaves and prickly wings along the stems, both with a white marginal vein. The yellow flowerheads stand solitary or with a few together at the tip to the stems, and subtended by more than five leaflike bracts. The plant is known as scolyme taché in French, cardogna macchiata in Italian, cardo borriquero in Spanish, and escólimo-malhado in Portuguese, חוח עקוד in Hebrew and سنارية حولية in Arabic. In English it is called spotted golden thistle or spotted oyster thistle.

Description 
Scolymus maculatus is a spiny herbaceous annual, biennials or perennials of up to 1½ m high, that contains a milky latex. It has twenty chromosomes (2n=20).

Root, stem and leaves 
The stems carry uninterrupted spiny wings along their lengths. The wavy leaves are approximately ovate in shape, mostly 9–14 cm long, with prominent white veins which are pinnately divided, alternately set along the stems, and have a dentate margin tipped with spines and a white vein all around their outline.

Inflorescence, flowers and fruits 

The flowerheads are seated at the end of the stem or in the limbs of the higher leaves, and are arranged in roundish clusters, which are subtended by more than five leaflike bracts. Each flowerhead is circled by an involucre that consists of many spine-tipped bracts of usually between 11 and 18 mm long, in several rows, the outer papery and shorter than the inner ones, which are leaflike in consistency and have a white papery margin. These surround the common floral base (or receptacle), which is mostly 7–11 mm in diameter conical in shape and is set with ovate papery bracts called chaff or paleae. Inplanted are dorsally compressed cypselas, each enclosed by a palea, the outer rows higher than the inner ones. There are no pappus bristles on top of the cypselas. The yellow, strap-like corolla is usually 17–24 mm long, ends in five teeth, and carries some black hairs on the tube.

Characters common to all Asteraceae 
Like in all Asteraceae, the pentameric flowers have anthers that are fused together forming a tube through which the style grows. The style picks up the pollen on hairs along its length and splits into two style branches at its tip. These parts sit on an inferior ovary that grows into an indehiscent fruit in which only one seed develops (a so-called cypsela). All florets are set on a common base (the receptacle), and are surrounded by several rows of bracts, that form an involucre.

Characters common to Cichorieae 
Golden thistles are assigned to the Cichorieae tribe that shares anastomosing latex canals in both root, stem and leaves, and has flower heads only consisting of one type of floret. In Scolymus these are ligulate florets, common to the group except for Warionia and Gundelia, which only have disk florets.
A unique character setting Scolymus apart from the other Cichorieae are the dorsally compressed cypsellas which are surrounded by scales (or paleae).

Differences between the species 
S. maculatus is an annual of up to 1.5 m high, there are more than five leaf-like bracts subtending each cluster of flowerhead, and these bracts are pinnately divided. The yellow florets carry some black hairs. The cypselas do not have pappus at their top (but are encased by the paleae). The spined wings along the stems are uninterrupted. Leaves have a whitish vein along their margin.

S. grandiflorus is an annual or biennial of up to 0.75 m high with one, two or three leaf-like bracts subtending each cluster of flowerheads and these are spiny dentate. The yellow to orange florets do not have black hairs. The cypselas are topped by three to seven bristles of smooth pappus hairs (and are encased by the paleae). The spined wings along the stems are uninterrupted.

S. hispanicus is an annual, biennial or perennial of up to 1.75 m high and it also has one, two or three spiny dentate leaf-like bracts subtending each cluster of flowerheads and the yellow, orange or white florets also lack black hairs. The cypselas however are topped by two to five bristles of scabrous pappus hairs (and are encased by the paleae). In this species the spined wings along the stems are interrupted.

Distribution 
The species naturally occurs on the Canary Islands, Madeira and along the Mediterranean, notably in Portugal, Spain (including on the Baleares), France (the coast of the Languedoc-Roussillon region, and the departements Vaucluse, Lot, Bas-Rhin and Somme), Italy (Sicily, Sardinia, Tuscany, Lazio, Campania, Basilicata, Calabria Apulia, Molise and Abruzzo), Malta, Greece, Cyprus, Turkey, Lebanon, Syria, Iraq, Israel, Egypt, Tunesia, Algeria and Morocco.

Ecology 
Scolymus maculatus is nitrophilous plant, that prefers deep, rich, but disturbed clayey soils in sunny or lightly shaded positions, such as fallowed or abandoned fields, ditches and roadsides. It generally only occurs below 700 m altitude, and along the coast, where there are less than 15 frost days. In Israel it occurs in woodlands and shrublands, steppes, and desert, but also in the montane vegetation on Mount Hermon. Flowers are present between May and August. The hermaphrodite flowers are pollinated by insects.

References 

 Neglected horticultural crops - Scolymus maculatus

External links

Cichorieae
Flora of Western Asia
Flora of Macaronesia
Plants described in 1753
Taxa named by Carl Linnaeus